Maurice Crosbie, D.D. (27 November 1733 – 28 June 1809) was an Anglican priest in Ireland at the end of 18th and the beginning of the 19th-centuries.

The son of Maurice Crosbie, 1st Baron Brandon, he was educated at Trinity College, Dublin. Crosbie was Rector of Castleisland, then  Dean of Limerick from 1771 until his death.

References

1809 deaths
Alumni of Trinity College Dublin
18th-century Irish Anglican priests
19th-century Irish Anglican priests
1733 births
Deans of Limerick